A shortwave broadband antenna is a radio antenna that can be used for transmission (and reception) of any shortwave radio band from among the greater part of the shortwave radio spectrum, without requiring any band-by-band adjustment of the antenna. Generally speaking, there is no difficulty in building an adequate receiving antenna; the challenge is designing an antenna which can be used for transmission without an adjustable impedance matching network.

An ideal “broadband” shortwave antenna would work continuously across much of, if not all of, the shortwave spectrum with good radiation efficiency and minimal compromise of the radiation pattern. Most practical broadband antennas compromise on one of the above: Either they only work on a few relatively narrow slices of the HF radio spectrum, or they work across the complete spectrum, without gaps, but are inefficient radiators on some or all of the frequencies. Other antennas provide adequate efficiency on some frequencies, but require a separate antenna tuner to function on others. A few designs remain omnidirectional on all frequencies but most “beam” antennas lose their directionality.

Background
At the lower shortwave frequencies e.g. 1.8 MHz, the antennas need to be physically large to enable good coupling to "space" and hence efficient radiation. As an example, at 5 MHz a half wave dipole antenna is around 27 meters long (90 ft.), at 3.5 MHz nearly 41 meters (133 ft.), and 2 MHz it is 71 meters long (234 ft.). Half-wave horizontal dipoles are efficient radiators, if they are about half their length above ground or higher; if low to the ground relative to wavelength then horizontal dipoles suffer from large loss of signal in the earth and are inefficient radiators. Half wave dipoles are narrow band (only work over a very small frequency range) before serious impedance mismatch occurs. This mismatch can be accommodated using an antenna tuner but these add to costs and modern shortwave communication often uses frequency hopping techniques. Even automatic antenna tuners will not work with frequency hopping signals.

A less ambitious idea of “broadband antenna” is an that one continuously covers the widest amateur band, that spans 3.5 MHz–4.0 MHz (a 14% bandwidth), without requiring an antenna tuner. There are many such designs, but those are not discussed here.

Broadband shortwave base antennas traditionally fall into two main categories:
 Resistively loaded antennas which can be inexpensive and reasonably compact but inefficient at lower frequencies.
 Large elaborate and very expensive, non-loaded designs. (These can cost upward of $80,000 to purchase and install).

Many "broadband" designs used by the amateur radio enthusiasts are generally not true broadband antennas as they only transmit well (without an antenna tuner) in the harmonically related Amateur bands.

The challenge for many years has been to devise an antenna which is an efficient radiator, compact, and also inexpensive. Previous solutions include the Barker Williamson folded dipole, the Australian traveling-wave antenna and other designs by Guertler etc.

Some shortwave broadband antennas can even be used on the whole shortwave radio spectrum (1.6–30 MHz) which consist of the upper part of medium frequency (1.6–3 MHz) and the whole of high frequency (3–30 MHz).

Examples 
 T2FD antenna – its all-around performance, relatively modest size, low cost, and the fact that it does not require any complex electronic matching to operate with a standard shortwave transmitter, have made it popular in professional shortwave communications.

 Log-periodic antenna – The log periodic is commonly used in high power short wave broadcasting where it is desired to invest in only a single antenna to cover transmissions over multiple bands. It is the only type of directional antenna that maintains directionality over its entire working range.

 Discone antenna – Omnidirectional, vertically polarized and with gain similar to a dipole, it is exceptionally wideband, offering a frequency range ratio of up to approximately 10:1.

 Traveling-wave antenna – An advantage of traveling wave antennas is that since they are nonresonant they often have a wider bandwidth than resonant antennas.

 Terminated Coaxial Cage Monopole (TC2M) – a vertical polarized broadband shortwave antenna. The antenna can be characterized by being a vertical traveling-wave coaxially caged monopole over a ground plane.

All Windom-style antennas have wide coverage gaps inbetween their nearly-harmonic working bands. Varying the position and length of the antenna, and adding loading stubs near its center can alter the sequence of feasible frequencies, and add more frequencies to the list.
 Among the off-center-fed designs are the “Carolina Windom”, (which deliberately uses radiation from its feedline), the K5GP antenna, the ON4AA antenna (six bands).

 Robinson-Barnes antenna – A restively terminated antenna designed and developed in the early 1990s by Graham Robinson and John Barnes and has become a widely used design for commercial and military shortwave base-stations, where ground space is limited, yet a 4 octave bandwidth (2–30 MHz) is required. It is a center-fed wire antenna with two arms, each consisting of three radiating elements and is generally tower mounted, either horizontally or as an "inverted V".

See also 
 Antenna tuner
 Shortwave radio receiver

Footnotes

References

  
  
  
 

Antennas (radio)